Miroslav Hajdučík is a Czechoslovak slalom canoeist who competed at the international level from 1982 to 1989.

He won a bronze medal in the C2 event at the 1987 ICF Canoe Slalom World Championships in Bourg St.-Maurice. He also won two golds (1983, 1985) and two silvers (1987, 1989) at the World Championships in the C2 team event.

His partner in the C2 boat throughout his career was Milan Kučera.

References

Czechoslovak male canoeists
Living people
Year of birth missing (living people)
Medalists at the ICF Canoe Slalom World Championships